629 Bernardina is a minor planet orbiting the Sun.

References

External links
 
 

Background asteroids
Bernardina
Bernardina
X-type asteroids (SMASS)
19070307